This is a list of tallest buildings in Lithuania. The rankings are based on the building's structural height (vertical elevation from the base to the highest architectural or integral structural element of the building). For this reason, buildings with spires are measured to the top of the spire, however, antennas on top of buildings are not counted to their overall height. Towers, such as the Vilnius TV Tower are not considered buildings as they are not continuously habitable, and will not be found on this list.

List of completed buildings of over 60 meters

Proposed and under-construction buildings of over 60 meters

References

Lithuania
Tallest buildings
Lithuania